Shanaelle Petty (born 28 February 1998) is a Croatian-American model and beauty pageant titleholder who was crowned Miss Universe Croatia 2017 and represented Croatia at Miss Universe 2017 pageant where she made the top 16.

Early life
Petty was born in Bad Kreuznach, Germany to an African American father and a Croatian mother. She graduated from Terry Sanford High School in Fayetteville, North Carolina, and speaks fluent English, Spanish, and Croatian. She aspires to work for NASA, and attends the Massachusetts Institute of Technology.

Pageantry

Miss Universe Croatia 2017
On 28 April 2017, Petty was crowned Miss Universe Croatia 2017. More than 300 girls applied to compete, and 18 finalists were chosen. Petty ended up being crowned the winner by outgoing titleholder Barbara Filipović.

Miss Universe 2017
Petty represented Croatia at Miss Universe 2017 and she became only the third woman from Croatia to reach the Top 16.

References

External links
Official Miss Universe Hrvatske website

1998 births
Living people
Miss Universe 2017 contestants
Croatian beauty pageant winners
Croatian female models
Croatian people of African-American descent
American people of Croatian descent
People from Fayetteville, North Carolina
People from Slavonski Brod
Female models from North Carolina
African-American female models
American female models
African-American models
American expatriates in Germany
21st-century African-American people
21st-century African-American women